Borhène Ghannem (born 14 January 1987) is a retired Tunisian football midfielder.

References

1987 births
Living people
Tunisian footballers
Club Africain players
JS Kairouan players
Espérance Sportive de Tunis players
ES Beni-Khalled players
Stade Tunisien players
US Monastir (football) players
EGS Gafsa players
Association football midfielders
Tunisian Ligue Professionnelle 1 players